Martin van der Borgh (28 October 1934 – 12 February 2018) was a Dutch cyclist who was active between 1954 and 1964. He won the Ronde van Limburg (1954), Tour du Nord (1961) and individual stages of the Tour de France (1960) and Tour de Luxembourg (1958, 1963). He also won the bronze medal in the road race at the 1954 UCI Road World Championships.

He was born in Koningsbosch and died, aged 83, in Brunssum.

References

1934 births
2018 deaths
Dutch male cyclists
People from Echt-Susteren
UCI Road World Championships cyclists for the Netherlands
Cyclists from Limburg (Netherlands)
20th-century Dutch people